Shaun Breslin FAcSS is Professor of Politics and International Studies at the University of Warwick, United Kingdom. He is considered as a leading British academic expert on Chinese politics and economy, globalization, regionalism, governance and international political economy.

He is the author of China Risen" Studying Chinese Global Power (Bristol: Bristol University Press, 2021), China and the Global Political Economy (Basingstoke: Palgrave-Macmillan, 2007), Mao (Harlow: Longman, 2000, first edition 1998), and China in the 1980s: Centre-Province Relations in a Reforming Socialist State (Basingstoke: Macmillan and New York: St Martins, 1996). Professor Breslin is also the co-author of four other academic books and numerous publication in his field.

Professor Breslin is co-editor of The Pacific Review, senior research fellow at the Wong MNC Center, and associate research fellow of ISPI in Milan. He is also a fellow of the Academy of Social Sciences.

Notes 

Academics of the University of Warwick
Living people
Chatham House people
Year of birth missing (living people)
Fellows of the Academy of Social Sciences
British international relations scholars